was a Japanese daimyō of the Edo period, who ruled Hiroshima Domain. His childhood name was Sadakichi (定吉) later become Sadanosuke (定之丞) later become Zenjirō (善次郎).

Family
 Father: Asano Naritaka
 Wife: Tokugawa Toshihime, daughter of Tokugawa Naritaka, 12th Daimyo of Owari Domain (and son of the 11th shōgun Tokugawa Ienari)

He was succeeded by his cousin Asano Nagamichi (1812-1872), grandson of Asano Shigeakira (1743-1814), 7th Daimyo of Hiroshima Domain.

References 

1836 births
1858 deaths
Daimyo
Asano clan